Ryan Mouton (born September 23, 1986) is a former American football cornerback. He was drafted by the Tennessee Titans in the third round of the 2009 NFL Draft. He played college football at Hawaii.

Professional career

Tennessee Titans
Mouton was selected by the Tennessee Titans in the third round of the 2009 NFL Draft with the 94th overall pick.

Washington Redskins
Mouton was signed by the Washington Redskins on July 25, 2013. He was placed on team's injured reserve on August 28, but two days later the Redskins released him with an injury settlement.

Mouton signed a reserve/future contract with the Washington Redskins on December 31, 2013. He was released on April 5, 2014.

Calgary Stampeders
Mouton was signed to the Calgary Stampeders practice roster on October 13, 2014. He was released by the Stampeders on November 6, 2014.

References

External links
Hawaii Rainbow Warriors bio
 Tennessee Titans bio

1986 births
Living people
American football cornerbacks
Hawaii Rainbow Warriors football players
Players of American football from Houston
Players of Canadian football from Houston
Tennessee Titans players
Washington Redskins players